Herpetopoma fenestratum is a species of sea snail, a marine gastropod mollusk in the family Chilodontidae.

Description
The height of the shell attains 4 mm.

Distribution
This marine species occurs off South Australia and Western Australia.

References

 Hedley, C., 1916. A preliminary index of the Mollusca of Western Australia. J. Proc. R. Soc. West. Aust., 1:3-77
 Cotton, B.C. (1945). Southern Australian Gastropoda. Part 1. Streptoneura. Transactions of the Royal Society of South Australia. 69 (1)
 Wilson, B., 1993. Australian Marine Shells. Prosobranch Gastropods.. Odyssey Publishing, Kallaroo, WA

External links
 To World Register of Marine Species

 fenestratum
Gastropods described in 1893